Lutter (also: Lutterbach) is a river of North Rhine-Westphalia, Germany. The river Aa is formed at its confluence with the Johannisbach (considered the upper course of the Aa).

See also
List of rivers of North Rhine-Westphalia

References

Rivers of North Rhine-Westphalia
Rivers of Germany